Paul Gleghorne (born 11 April 1987) is an Ireland men's field hockey international. He was a member of the Ireland team that won the bronze medal at the 2015 Men's EuroHockey Nations Championship.  He also represented Ireland at the 2016 Summer Olympics and at the 2018 Men's Hockey World Cup. At club level, he has won the Men's Irish Hockey League with Lisnagarvey. Gleghorne is a member of a family of field hockey internationals. His older brother, Mark, has played for Ireland, England and Great Britain. Two of his aunts, Margaret Gleghorne and Jackie McWilliams, were also Ireland and Great Britain women's internationals.

Early years, family and education
Gleghorne was born into a field hockey family. His father, Andy, was a player and club secretary at Antrim Hockey Club while his mother, Anne, played with and coached Randalstown. Anne Gleghorne died in 2003. His older brother, Mark, has played for Ireland, England and Great Britain. Two of his aunts, Margaret Gleghorne and Jackie McWilliams, were also Ireland and Great Britain women's internationals. He completed his secondary level education at Royal Belfast Academical Institution. Between 2006 and 2009 he attended Loughborough University were he gained a first class honours degree in Accounting and Financial Management. Between 2010 and 2014 he completed his accountancy training with Chartered Accountants Ireland.

Domestic teams

RBAI
In 2003–04, together with Michael Watt and John Jackson, Gleghorne was a member of the Royal Belfast Academical Institution team that won the McCullough Cup, the Burney Cup and the All Ireland Schoolboys Hockey Championship. He played in the McCullough Cup final just hours after the death of his mother, Anne.

Instonians
In 2003–04, together with his brother, Mark, and Michael Watt, Gleghorne was a member of the Instonians team that won the Irish Senior Cup, defeating Cork Harlequins 1–0 in the final. 
After graduating from Loughborough University, Gleghorne re-joined Instonians before subsequently moving on to Lisnagarvey.

Loughborough Students
While attending Loughborough University between 2006 and 2009, Gleghorne played for Loughborough Students' Hockey Club.  He also played for Loughborough in the 2007–08 Euro Hockey League.

Lisnagarvey
In 2015 Gleghorne began playing for Lisnagarvey.
In 2015–16, along with Jonathan Bell, Sean Murray and Michael Watt, Gleghorne was a member of the Lisnagarvey team that won the Men's Irish Hockey League and the EY Champions Trophy. Gleghorne and Lisnagarvey also reached the final of the 2015–16 Irish Senior Cup but lost to Monkstown after a penalty shoot-out. Gleghorne also played for Lisnagarvey in the 2016–17 Euro Hockey League.

Crefelder HTC
In 2018 Gleghorne began playing for Crefelder HTC in the Feldhockey Bundesliga. Together with Neal Glassey and Michael Robson, he was one of three Lisnagarvey players to move to Crefelder HTC.

Ireland international
Gleghorne made his senior Ireland debut in June 2009 in a Celtic Cup match against France.  Gleghorne and his fellow debutant, Chris Cargo, both scored in a 3–1 win for Ireland. Gleghorne was a member of the Ireland team that won the 2011 Men's Hockey Champions Challenge II. He also helped Ireland win Men's FIH Hockey World League tournaments in 2012, 2015 and 2017. Gleghorne was also a member of the Ireland team that won the bronze medal at the 2015 Men's EuroHockey Nations Championship. He also represented Ireland at the 2016 Summer Olympics In June 2017 he was a member of the Ireland team that won the Hamburg Masters, defeating Germany 4–2 in the final.
In May 2018, Gleghorne made his 200th senior appearance for Ireland in a 1–1 with Germany and later in the year played in the 2018 Men's Hockey World Cup.

Employment
Between 2010 and 2014, Gleghorne trained as a chartered accountant with KPMG. He subsequently worked for the Viridian Group from 2014 to 2015. He again worked for KPMG from 2015 to 2017. In February 2018 he was appointed senior manager in the corporate finance team of the Belfast-based HNH Group.

Honours
Ireland
Hamburg Masters
Winners: 2017 
Men's FIH Hockey World League Round 1
Winners: 2012 Cardiff
Men's FIH Hockey World League Round 2
Winners: 2015 San Diego, 2017 Belfast
Runners up: 2013 New Delhi
Men's FIH Series Finals
Runners up: 2019 Le Touquet
Men's Hockey Champions Challenge II
Winners: 2011
Men's Field Hockey Olympic Qualifier
Runners up: 2012
Men's Hockey Investec Cup
Runners up: 2014
Lisnagarvey
Men's Irish Hockey League
Winners: 2015–16: 1
EY Champions Trophy
Winners: 2016: 1
Irish Senior Cup
Runners up: 2015–16: 1
Instonians
Irish Senior Cup
Winners: 2003–04: 1
RBAI
All Ireland Schoolboys Hockey Championship
Winners: 2003–04: 1
Burney Cup
Winners: 2003–04: 1
McCullough Cup
Winners: 2003–04: 1

References

1987 births
Living people
Ireland international men's field hockey players
Male field hockey players from Northern Ireland
Irish male field hockey players
British male field hockey players
Olympic field hockey players of Ireland
Field hockey players at the 2016 Summer Olympics
2018 Men's Hockey World Cup players
Male field hockey defenders
Instonians field hockey players
Lisnagarvey Hockey Club players
Men's Irish Hockey League players
Loughborough Students field hockey players
Men's England Hockey League players
Expatriate field hockey players
Irish expatriate sportspeople in England
Expatriate sportspeople from Northern Ireland in Germany
Sportspeople from Ballymena
People educated at the Royal Belfast Academical Institution
Alumni of Loughborough University
Accountants from Northern Ireland
KPMG people